Fure's Cabin is a historic  log cabin that was built in c.1926. Also known as Roy Fure's Trapping Cabin, it was listed on the National Register of Historic Places in 1985; the listing included three contributing buildings (cabin, and a shed, and an outhouse) and one other contributing structure (a  windmill tower).

See also
National Register of Historic Places listings in Lake and Peninsula Borough, Alaska
National Register of Historic Places listings in Katmai National Park and Preserve

References

Houses completed in 1926
Houses in Lake and Peninsula Borough, Alaska
Houses on the National Register of Historic Places in Alaska
Log cabins in the United States
Park buildings and structures on the National Register of Historic Places in Alaska
Buildings and structures on the National Register of Historic Places in Lake and Peninsula Borough, Alaska
Log buildings and structures on the National Register of Historic Places in Alaska
1926 establishments in Alaska
National Register of Historic Places in Katmai National Park and Preserve